These are the results of the 1977 IAAF World Cup, an international track and field sporting event sponsored by the International Association of Athletics Federations, held on 2–4 September 1977 at the Rheinstadion in Düsseldorf, West Germany.

The World Cup was contested by 309 athletes from 54 countries, and the winning teams were East Germany (men) and Europe (women).

In each event eight athletes represented eight teams:
In men's events five teams represented continents (Africa, Americas, Asia, Europe, Oceania) and the remaining three were three national teams (East Germany, West Germany and the United States). 
In women's events West Germany team was replaced by Soviet Union

In each event athletes won points for their team, with 9 points won by gold medal winners, 7 points for silver medalists, six for bronze, and so on all the way to a single point for eighth-place finishers.

Team results summary

Men's

Women's

Men

Track

Men's 100 metres
2 September 1977Wind: –0.3 m/s

Men's 200 metres
4 September 1977Wind: +1.0 m/s

Men's 400 metres
4 September 1977

Men's 800 metres
2 September 1977

Men's 1500 metres
3 September 1977

Men's 5000 metres
4 September 1977

Men's 10,000 metres
2 September

Men's 3000 metres steeplechase
3 September 1977

Men's 110 metres hurdles
4 September 1977Wind: 0.0 m/s

Men's 400 metres hurdles
2 September 1977

Men's 4×100 metres relay
3 September 1977

Men's 4×400 metres relay
4 September 1977

Field

Men's high jump
4 September 1977

Men's pole vault
3 September 1977

Men's long jump
2 September 1977

Men's triple jump
3 September 1977

Men's shot put
2 September 1977

Men's discus throw
2 September 1977

Men's hammer throw
3 September 1977

Men's javelin throw
4 September 1977

Women

Track

Women's 100 metres
3 September 1977Wind: 0.0 m/s

Women's 200 metres
2 September 1977Wind: –0.7 m/s

Women's 400 metres
4 September 1977

Women's 800 metres
3 September 1977

Women's 1500 metres
2 September 1977

Women's 3000 metres
4 September 1977

Women's 100 metres hurdles
3 September 1977Wind: 0.0 m/s

Women's 4×100 metres relay
4 September 1977

Women's 4×400 metres relay
2 September 1977

Field

Women's high jump
2 September 1977

Women's long jump
4 September 1977

Women's shot put
3 September 1977

Women's discus throw
4 September 1977

Women's javelin throw
2 September 1977

References

Sources
 
Full results at AthleticsDB.com

IAAF World Cup results
Events at the IAAF Continental Cups